Zazem-e Sofla (also Romanized as Zāzem-e Soflá; also known as Zazarm, Zāzarm-e Soflá, Zazarm Pāin, Zāzerm-e Pā’īn, Zāzerm-e Pā’īn, and Zāzerm-e Soflá) is a village in Howmeh Rural District, in the Central District of Harsin County, Kermanshah Province, Iran. At the 2006 census, its population was 213, in 51 families.

References 

Populated places in Harsin County